Mary Wright (July 30, 1908 – January 8, 1975) was an American gymnast. She competed in the women's artistic team all-around event at the 1936 Summer Olympics.

References

External links
 

1908 births
1975 deaths
American female artistic gymnasts
Olympic gymnasts of the United States
Gymnasts at the 1936 Summer Olympics
Sportspeople from San Antonio